Kurt Hancock (born 9 January 1980 in Kempsey, New South Wales) is an Australian former professional rugby league footballer who played in the 2000s. He played for the Newcastle Knights in 2005.

External links
http://www.rugbyleagueproject.org/players/Kurt_Hancock/summary.html

1980 births
Living people
Australian rugby league players
Newcastle Knights players
Rugby league players from New South Wales
Rugby articles needing expert attention